Three ships of the Royal Navy have been named HMS Implacable:
 The first , launched in 1795 as the French ship Duguay-Trouin, was a 74-gun third-rate ship of the line. Captured by the British on 3 November 1805, she was renamed Implacable. She was scuttled in 1949, by then the second oldest ship of the Navy (after ). 
She served in World War I and fought at the Dardanelles. She was sold for scrapping in 1921.
 The third , launched in 1942, was the lead ship of her class of aircraft carriers. She served in World War II and was broken up in 1954.

References
 

Royal Navy ship names